Mario Herrero (born 2 March 1967) is a professor of sustainable food systems and global change in the College of Agriculture and Life Sciences at Cornell University. He also serves as a scholar within the Atkinson Center for a Sustainable Future.

Previously, he was an Executive Science Leader at CSIRO Agriculture and Food and Honorary Professor of Agriculture and Food Systems at the University of Queensland, Australia.

He obtained his Ph.D. in Agricultural Systems at the University of Edinburgh, Edinburgh, Scotland.

He is ranked number 10 on the Reuters Hot List of most influential climate academics.

References 

Living people
1967 births
Costa Rican scientists
Agronomists
Cornell University faculty